Ōtāhuhu railway station is located on the Eastern and Southern Lines of the Auckland rail network in New Zealand. It has an island platform configuration and is part of an integrated bus-train major transport hub. It can be reached by steps and lift from an overhead concourse that leads from the adjacent bus transfer station and Walmsley Road.

Ōtāhuhu station features a historic, decommissioned signal box and is the point where both freight and passenger trains enter and exit the main line from the Westfield locomotive depot.

The station was opened in 1875 to serve the increasing settlement at Ōtāhuhu, with a road eventually constructed to the station. The station included a goods shed and a main building, which however burned down in 1909 after a fire in the oil room got out of hand with no water supply available to suppress the fires.

Upgrade

In May 2011, Auckland Transport and KiwiRail started work to lengthen the platform to accommodate longer passenger trains. The platform area around the signal box was raised and further platform installed around the base of the pedestrian over bridge to Walmsley Road.

In July 2011, the signal box at the station was one of the last to be decommissioned in Auckland, as part of a project to upgrade the signalling of the Auckland suburban network in preparation for electrification. Mainline signalling in the Ōtāhuhu station limits will be operated from the National Train Control Centre (NTCC) in Wellington, along with the rest of the Auckland network.

A new southbound platform,  of track and four crossovers were opened in December 2020, as part of the City Rail Link works to enable trains to turn back and reduce the need for bus passengers to use the bridge.

Bus-train interchange
Concern was raised in 2007 about the 1.2 km walk between the station and the nearest bus services, with the station located in an out-of-the-way industrial area. These concerns were addressed by the construction of a bus-train interchange which opened in October 2016.

A public open day was held with station designers in August 2014. Enabling works began in November 2014 after the temporary closure of Titi Street Bridge. The following year (November 2015) main construction works began (building the concourse area and landscaping).

The $28 million bus-train interchange and concourse was completed in October 2016 and was opened on 29 October 2016.

The decommissioned signal box has been retained as a historic feature of the new station.

Nearby infrastructure

In 1927, Ōtāhuhu Railway Workshops opened on a site west of the station. This facility became the North Island's foremost wagon and carriage construction and repair facility. It was progressively closed from 1986 to 1992.

Further south, between Ōtāhuhu station and Mangere station, a rail fabrication facility was built. This facility is still in use. Ōtāhuhu also possessed Auckland's second-largest locomotive depot, which was opened in 1905, and closed in 1968, with the opening of the Westfield facility.

Services
Auckland One Rail, on behalf of Auckland Transport, operates suburban services to Britomart, Manukau, Papakura and Pukekohe via Ōtāhuhu. The typical weekday off-peak timetable is:
6 tph to Britomart, consisting of:
3 tph via Glen Innes (Eastern Line)
3 tph via Penrose and Newmarket (Southern Line)
3 tph to Manukau
3 tph to Papakura

Bus routes 32, 33, 321, 322, 324, 325, 326, and 351 serve Ōtāhuhu Station.

See also 
 List of Auckland railway stations
 Public transport in Auckland

References 

Rail transport in Auckland
Railway stations in New Zealand
Railway stations opened in 1873
Bus stations in New Zealand
Transport buildings and structures in the Auckland Region